Jumada al-Thani, also known as Jumada al-Akhirah, Jumada al-Akhir, or Jumada II, is the sixth month of the Islamic calendar. The word Jumda, from which the name of the month is derived, is used to denote dry, parched land, a land devoid of rain. Jumādā may also be related to a verb meaning "to freeze", and another account relates that water would freeze in pre-Islamic Arabia during this time of year.

In Ottoman Turkish, the month was called Jèmāzìyyu-'l-ākhir, or G̃emazi-yèl-Aher. The month's Turkish abbreviation was jìm''', and its Latin abbreviation was Djem. II. This is also spelled Cümadelahir or Cümâd-el-âhire. The modern Turkish spellings are Cemaziyelahir and Cemaziyelsani''.

Timing
The Islamic calendar is a purely lunar calendar, and months begin when the first crescent of a new moon is sighted. Since the Islamic lunar year is 11 to 12 days shorter than the solar year, Jumada al-Thani migrates throughout the seasons. The estimated start and end dates for Jumada al-Thani are as follows (based on the Umm al-Qura calendar of Saudi Arabia):

Islamic events
 03 Jumada al-Thani, death of Muhammad's daughter Fatimah in 11 AH.
 03 Jumada al-Thani, death of Harun al-Rashid, the fifth Abbasid caliph.
 10 Jumada al-Thani, victory of Ali in the Battle of Bassorah (Jamal).
 13 Jumada al-Thani, death of Umm al-Banin (the mother of Abbas ibn Ali).
 20 Jumada al-Thani, birth of Muhammad's daughter Fatima Zahra.
 22 Jumada al-Thani, death of Caliph Abu Bakr.
 In 8 AH, Dhat as-Salasil.
 25 Jumada al-Thani of 564 AH, Saladin became amir of Egypt.

See also 
 Jumada al-Awwal

References

External links
Islamic-Western Calendar Converter (Based on the Arithmetical or Tabular Calendar)

6
Islamic terminology
sv:Jumada-l-Akhirah